Mohammad Omar Abdel-Rahim Abdel-Haleem is a Jordanian retired footballer of Palestinian origin.

Honours
Top Goalscorer Jordan Premier League 2008–09 (13 goals)
Top Goalscorer Jordan Premier League 2010–11 (16 goals)

References

External links
 
 

1982 births
Living people
Jordanian footballers
Jordanian people of Palestinian descent
Sportspeople from Amman
Al-Baqa'a Club players
Mansheyat Bani Hasan players
Al-Ahli Club (Manama) players
Jordanian expatriate footballers
Expatriate footballers in Bahrain
Jordanian expatriate sportspeople in Bahrain
Association football forwards
Jordan international footballers
Jordanian Pro League players
Bahraini Premier League players